Harmodius may refer to:
 Harmodius and Aristogeiton (died 514 BC), the killers of the Athenian tyrant Hipparchus
 Harmodius of Lepreon, ancient Greek writer
 SS Harmodius